Lucas Cardoso Moreira (born 3 August 2000), known as Lucas Cardoso, is a Brazilian footballer who plays as an attacking midfielder for Cuiabá.

Club career
Born in Poxoréu, Mato Grosso, Lucas Cardoso made his senior debut with local side União Rondonópolis in the 2020 Campeonato Mato-Grossense. On 17 August of that year, he was announced at Série D side CEOV.

In June 2021, after scoring eight goals and being the top goalscorer of the 2021 Mato-Grossense, Lucas Cardoso signed for Cuiabá, and was initially assigned to the under-23 squad. On 14 December, he was loaned to Santo André for the 2022 Campeonato Paulista.

Upon returning, Lucas Cardoso was initially assigned to the under-23 team, but made his Série A debut on 23 October 2022, replacing Gabriel Pirani in a 2–1 home loss against Goiás.

Career statistics

References

2000 births
Living people
Sportspeople from Mato Grosso
Brazilian footballers
Association football midfielders
Campeonato Brasileiro Série A players
União Esporte Clube players
CE Operário Várzea-Grandense players
Cuiabá Esporte Clube players
Esporte Clube Santo André players